Patrick Grigoriu (born 25 March 1991, in Bucharest) is a Romanian tennis player. 

Grigoriu has a career high ATP singles ranking of 1496 achieved on 15 August 2011. He also has a career high ATP doubles ranking of 186 achieved on 17 November 2014.

Grigoriu won his first ATP Challenger Tour doubles title at the 2014 Internazionali di Tennis Castel del Monte, partnering Costin Pavăl, defeating Roman Jebavý and Andreas Siljeström in the final, 7–6(7–4), 6–7(4–7), [10–5].

External links

1991 births
Living people
Romanian male tennis players
Tennis players from Bucharest
21st-century Romanian people